The Columbus Blue Jackets are an American professional ice hockey team based in Columbus, Ohio. They play in the Metropolitan Division of the Eastern Conference in the National Hockey League (NHL). The team joined the NHL in 2000 as an expansion team. The Blue Jackets have played their home games at the Nationwide Arena since their inaugural season. The team has had three general managers since their inception.

Key

General managers

Notes
 A running total of the number of general managers of the franchise. Thus any general manager who has two or more separate terms as general manager is only counted once. Interim general managers do not count towards the total.

See also
List of NHL general managers

References

Columbus Blue Jackets
General managers
Columbus Blue Jackets general managers